Nowa Cerkiew may refer to the following places:
Nowa Cerkiew, Chojnice County in Pomeranian Voivodeship (north Poland)
Nowa Cerkiew, Nowy Dwór Gdański County in Pomeranian Voivodeship (north Poland)
Nowa Cerkiew, Tczew County in Pomeranian Voivodeship (north Poland)